Kosmos 1164 ( meaning Cosmos 1164) was a Soviet US-K missile early warning satellite which was launched in 1980 as part of the Soviet military's Oko programme. The satellite was designed to identify missile launches using optical telescopes and infrared sensors, however due to a launch failure, it was never used for the purpose.

Kosmos 1164 was launched from Site 43/4 at Plesetsk Cosmodrome in the Russian SSR. A Molniya-M carrier rocket with a 2BL upper stage was used to perform the launch, which took place at 00:53 UTC on 12 February 1980. The launch was unsuccessful and placed the satellite into low Earth orbit rather than the intended molniya orbit. It subsequently received its Kosmos designation, and the international designator 1980-013A. The United States Space Command assigned it the Satellite Catalog Number 11700.

It re-entered the Earth's atmosphere on 12 February 1980, the same day it was launched.

See also

List of Kosmos satellites (1001–1250)
List of R-7 launches (1980-1984)
1980 in spaceflight
List of Oko satellites

References

Kosmos satellites
Spacecraft launched in 1980
Oko
Satellite launch failures
Spacecraft launched by Molniya-M rockets
Spacecraft which reentered in 1980
Space accidents and incidents in the Soviet Union